Cengiz Yağız (born 21 December 1964) is a silver medalist Olympian Turkish taekwondo practitioner. He served as the president of the Turkey Taekwondo Federation between 1996–2003.

Cengiz Yağız was born in Ankara, Turkey on 21 December 1964.

Yağız won the silver medal in the featherweight division of the Taekwondo at the 1988 Summer Olympics in Seoul, South Korea.

Yağız served as the president of the Turkey Taekwondo Federation from 1996 until his dismission in 2003 . In 2012, he declared his intension to run again for the presidentship.

References

External links
 

1964 births
Living people
Sportspeople from Ankara
Turkish male taekwondo practitioners
Olympic taekwondo practitioners of Turkey
Taekwondo practitioners at the 1988 Summer Olympics
Olympic silver medalists for Turkey
Turkish sports executives and administrators
World Taekwondo Championships medalists